Luc Côté is a Montreal-based film-maker.
You Don't Like the Truth, a film he co-directed with frequent collaborator Patricio Henriquez won the best documentary about society award at the first Gémeaux Awards in 2011.

References

Canadian documentary film directors
Film directors from Montreal
Living people
Year of birth missing (living people)